Tomi Joutsen (born 30 April 1975) is a Finnish musician, perhaps best known as the vocalist/frontman of the heavy metal band Amorphis (2005–), although also a member of other metal bands including Corpse Molester Cult (2008-), as their guitarist and backing vocalist, and Hallatar (2017-), as their vocalist. He was formerly the vocalist for the bands Käsi / Funeral Jacket (1995-1999) and Nevergreen / Sinisthra (2002-2008) and the drummer for the bands The Candles Burning Blue and Feelings.

Joutsen performs both harsh and clean baritone vocals, a contrast to the more traditional heavy metal and punk rock-style high-pitched vocals of the previous Amorphis singer, Pasi Koskinen. Joutsen's voice style is very deep, similar to gothic metal vocals in the vein of Nick Holmes' from Paradise Lost and Peter Steele of Type O Negative.

Discography

Käsi / Funeral Jacket

Käsi
Käsi - Demo (1995)
Käsi - EP (1997)

Funeral Jacket
Rock You Vol 1. (1999)

Nevergreen /Sinisthra

Nevergreen
Slowly Getting There (2002)	
Softly Whispering Mountains to Gravel (2002)
Effortlessly Improving on Perfection (2003)
Empty Banalities Adorned with Dashing Eloquence (2004)

Sinisthra
Last of the Stories of Long Past Glories (2005)
Sinisthra Promo 2008 (2008)

Amorphis
Eclipse (2006)
Silent Waters  (2007)
Skyforger (album) (2009)
Forging the Land of Thousand Lakes (2010)	
Magic & Mayhem - Tales from the Early Years (2010)	
The Beginning of Times (2011)
Circle (2013)	
Under the Red Cloud (2015)
Tales from Lake Bodom (2015)
An Evening with Friends at Huvila (2017)
Queen of Time (2018)
 Halo (2022)

Corpse Molester Cult
The Untitled Corpse Molester Cult (2008)
Benedictus Perverticus (2015)

Hallatar
No Stars Upon The Bridge (2017)

Guest Vocalist
Pretty White Dress - Marenne - (2007)
Don't Fall Asleep (Horror Pt. 2) / Hope - Swallow the Sun - (2007)
(Tracks 2, 5, 6, 10 & 11) - Carrion - Discard  (2007)
Spoknebone  - Release Date - Waltari (2007)
Star - Dirt Metal - Thunderstone (2009)
The Plague of a Coming Age & Boiling Heart of the North - The Plague of a Coming Age - October Falls (2013)
Meidänkaltaisillemme - Elokuutio - Stam1na (2016)
Lost in Wars - Bringer of Pain - Battle Beast (2017)
Needles and Kin - Verkligheten - Soilwork (2019)

References

External links

Amorphis homepage
Sinisthra homepage

1975 births
Living people
English-language singers from Finland
Amorphis members
Death metal musicians
Finnish heavy metal singers
21st-century Finnish male singers